Pride and Prejudice is a 1967 BBC television six-part serial, based on Jane Austen's 1813 novel of the same name.

This production marked the 150th anniversary of the death of Jane Austen.
It was directed by Joan Craft and starred Celia Bannerman and Lewis Fiander as the protagonists Elizabeth Bennet and Mr. Darcy.

This version omits the middle Bennet sister, Mary.

Unlike most of Craft's work for the BBC, the serial has survived intact. It is unavailable on home media, but can be found online. It is also the earliest television adaptation produced by the BBC to exist. The 55-minute teleplay from 1938, and the 1952 and 1958 serials, are all considered lost.

Cast 
 Celia Bannerman as Elizabeth Bennet
 Lewis Fiander as Mr. Darcy
 Michael Gough as Mr. Bennet
 Vivian Pickles as Mrs. Bennet
 Lucy Fleming as Lydia Bennet
 Sarah Taunton as Kitty Bennet
 Polly Adams as Jane Bennet
 Diana King as Lady Lucas
 Karin MacCarthy as Louisa Hurst
 David Savile as Mr. Bingley
 Georgina Ward as Caroline Bingley
 Robert Dorning as Sir William Lucas
 Richard Hampton as Mr. Wickham
 Vivian James as Mr. Hurst
 Sylvia Coleridge as Lady Catherine de Bourgh
 Hugh Cross as Mr. Gardiner
 Eithne Dunne as Mrs. Gardiner
 Kate Lansbury as Charlotte Lucas
 Julian Curry as Mr. Collins
 Steven Grives as Edward Lucas
 Maurice Quick as Servant
 Robin Chadwick as Col. Fitzwilliam
 Hubert Hill as Servant
 Ralph Katterns as Servant
 Janette Legge as Miss Anne de Bourgh
 Tessa Wyatt as Georgiana Darcy

Episodes 
Original air dates:
 "Neighbours" – 10 September 1967
 "Pride" – 17 September 1967
 "Proposal" – 24 September 1967
 "Prejudice" – 1 October 1967
 "Elopement" – 8 October 1967
 "Destiny" – 15 October 1967

References

External links 

 
 

1967 British television series debuts
1967 British television series endings
1960s British drama television series
BBC television dramas
1960s British television miniseries
Television series set in the 19th century
English-language television shows
Television series based on Pride and Prejudice
1960s British romance television series
Television shows set in England
Costume drama television series